is a Japanese rock band formed on October 8, 2006. They consist of vocalist and bassist Margaret Hiroi, guitarist Katzuya Shimizu and drummer Kenzo. The name, which means "pilgrimage to eighty-eight places," is reminiscent of the Shikoku pilgrimage. Their music combines elements of jam band, heavy metal, alternative, psychedelic and progressive rock styles. All lyrics are written by Hiroi and often contain references to religion, such as Buddhism or Shinto, and different yōkai. All albums are released through their own label, PPR.

The mascot character, who appears on numerous album covers, was created by Japanese animator  and nicknamed .

They performed outside of Japan for the first time at Eurockéennes Music Festival in France, on July 7, 2019.

Members

Current 
  – vocals, bass and lyrics (2006–present)
 Described on the official site as 
 A native of Yoshida (now Uwajima, Ehime).
 Started playing the bass in junior high school, describing that time as "practicing until midnight and listening to music all night long." 
 Briefly played in Green Milk from the Planet Orange until their disbandment in 2008. Also provided bass for the track "Alice" on the 2017 album Bootleg by Kenshi Yonezu.
 Has named Ningen Isu as one of the artistic influences, the two bands have also performed together once in 2014. Other favorite artists include King Crimson and Eastern Youth.
 The notable bass guitar design used in most of the band's first videos is a custom-made "Alien" model, crafted by Japanese guitar maker Nobuaki Hayashi (Atlansia).

 Katzuya Shimizu - guitar (2006–present)
 Described on the official site as 
 Learned classical piano as a child and started playing the guitar at age 15. Cites Steve Vai and Van Halen as the main influences on his playing style.
 Outside of band activities, he is giving guitar lessons and participating in recordings of other projects. Has provided guitar for the soundtracks of Nights of Azure and various Atelier video games by Gust.

  - drums (2006–present)
 Described on the official site as 
 A native of Ehime prefecture, Shikoku island.
 Started playing the drums in 5th grade. Named X Japan as having been one of the favorite bands to play to during his high school years.
 Since 2019, he has also been playing in a band named .

Discography

Studio albums

Live albums

Extended plays

Singles

Videos

Video albums

Music videos

Guest appearances

Acting performances 
 
 Appeared as a fictional band , with singer  as the vocalist

References

External links
Official site

2006 establishments in Japan
Japanese rock music groups
Musical groups established in 2006